Artres is a commune in the Nord department in northern France. A group of grave objects from a Frankish noble lady was found in Artres in the nineteenth century. Known as the Artres Treasure, it is now mostly in the British Museum.

Population

Heraldry

See also
Communes of the Nord department

References

Communes of Nord (French department)